The Migration Museum is a social history museum located in Adelaide, South Australia. It is one of the three museums operated by the History Trust of South Australia. It deals with the immigration and settlement history of South Australia, and maintains both a permanent and a rotating collection of works. Founded as an initiative of the State government in 1983, and with the museum opening on 23 November 1986, the Migration Museum in Adelaide is the oldest museum of its kind in Australia. The museum aims to promote cultural diversity and multiculturalism, which they define as including aspects of ethnicity, class, gender, age and region.

The site is located on Kintore Avenue between the State Library of South Australia, the South Australian Museum and the University of Adelaide, in a complex of early colonial bluestone buildings set around a courtyard, including  the city's former destitute asylum (from 1850–1918). Before this, the site was the location of the "Native School", which aimed to educate aboriginal children.

The Migration Museum has a full program of activities including education programs for school groups, public events and family friendly fun.

References

Gallery

Museums in Adelaide
History museums in Australia
Museums of human migration
Adelaide Park Lands